The Google Ngram Viewer or Google Books Ngram Viewer is an online search engine that charts the frequencies of any set of search strings using a yearly count of n-grams found in printed sources published between 1500 and 2019 in Google's text corpora in English, Chinese (simplified), French, German, Hebrew, Italian, Russian, or Spanish. There are also some specialized English corpora, such as American English, British English, and English Fiction.

The program can search for a word or a phrase, including misspellings or gibberish. The n-grams are matched with the text within the selected corpus, optionally using case-sensitive spelling (which compares the exact use of uppercase letters), and, if found in 40 or more books, are then displayed as a graph. The Google Ngram Viewer supports searches for parts of speech and wildcards. It is routinely used in research.

History
The program was developed by Jon Orwant and Will Brockman and released in mid-December 2010. It was inspired by a prototype called Bookworm created by Jean-Baptiste Michel and Erez Aiden from Harvard's Cultural Observatory, Yuan Shen from MIT, and Steven Pinker.
 
The Ngram Viewer was initially based on the 2009 edition of the Google Books Ngram Corpus. , the program supports 2009, 2012, and 2019 corpora.

Operation and restrictions
Commas delimit user-entered search terms, indicating each separate word or phrase to find. The Ngram Viewer returns a plotted line chart.

As an adjustment for more books having been published during some years, the data are normalized, as a relative level, by the number of books published in each year.

Due to limitations on the size of the Ngram database, only matches found in at least 40 books are indexed in the database.

Limitations
The data set has been criticized for its reliance upon inaccurate OCR, an overabundance of scientific literature, and for including large numbers of incorrectly dated and categorized texts. Because of these errors, and because it is  uncontrolled for bias (such as the increasing amount of scientific literature, which causes other terms to appear to decline in popularity), it is risky to use this corpus to study language or test theories. Since the data set does not include metadata, it may not reflect general linguistic or cultural change and can only hint at such an effect.

Guidelines for doing research with data from Google Ngram have been proposed that address many of the issues discussed above.

OCR issues
Optical character recognition, or OCR, is not always reliable, and some characters may not be scanned correctly. In particular, systemic errors like the confusion of s and f in pre-19th century texts (due to the use of the long s, which was similar in appearance to f) can cause systemic bias.  Although Google Ngram Viewer claims that the results are reliable from 1800 onwards, poor OCR and insufficient data mean that frequencies given for languages such as Chinese may only be accurate from 1970 onward, with earlier parts of the corpus showing no results at all for common terms, and data for some years containing more than 50% noise.

See also
 Culturomics
 Google Trends
 Lexical analysis

References

Bibliography

External links
 

Ngram Viewer
Ngram Viewer
2010 software
Natural language processing
Computational linguistics
Corpus linguistics